Pacific Island Aviation (PIA) was a commuter airline headquartered on the second floor of the Cabrera Center in Garapan, Saipan, Northern Mariana Islands. It operated passenger and cargo services. Its main base was Saipan International Airport. PIA's last flight was February 9, 2005.

Former code Data 

IATA Code: 9J
ICAO Code: PSA
Callsign: PACIFIC ISLE

History 

The airline was established in 1987 and began helicopter operations in August 1988. It secured commuter airline status in February 1992 and started operations as such on 21 March 1992. It became a codeshare partner with Continental Micronesia in December 1992 and took over flights to Guam, Rota and Saipan. In February 1995 Continental discontinued its service to Rota and Pacific Island Aviation began codesharing with Northwest Airlines, becoming a Northwest Airlink carrier in February 1998. It was wholly owned by Robert Christian.

After it discontinued service in Saipan, the airline attempted to restart its operations, but base itself out of Texas, providing flights from Dallas to Lake Charles and Beaumont. It planned to operate as Tri-Star Airways.

Services 

As of January 2005 Pacific Island Aviation operated the following services:

Guam (U.S.)
Antonio B. Won Pat International Airport
Northern Mariana Islands (U.S.)
Rota (Rota International Airport)
Saipan (Saipan International Airport)

(Services to Tinian International Airport on Tinian were suspended before the airline went out of business.)

Incidents and accidents 

27 October 1992 - Pacific Island Aviation Cessna 310R aircraft, at Saipan, two fatalities.

Fleet 

As of March 2005 the Pacific Island Aviation fleet included:

See also 
 List of defunct airlines of the United States

References

External links 

  via Wayback Machine

Defunct airlines of the Northern Mariana Islands
Airlines established in 1987
Airlines disestablished in 2005
Northwest Airlink